Maria Ansorge (15 December 1880 – 11 July 1955) was a German politician of the Social Democratic Party (SPD) and former member of the German Bundestag.

Life 
She was a member of the First Federal Assembly and was a member of the German Bundestag from 17 November 1951, when she succeeded her late party colleague Karl Brunner, until 1953.

Literature

References

1880 births
1955 deaths
Members of the Bundestag for North Rhine-Westphalia
Members of the Bundestag 1949–1953
Female members of the Bundestag
20th-century German women politicians
Members of the Bundestag for the Social Democratic Party of Germany